María Belón (born 1966) is a Spanish physician and motivational speaker, known for surviving the 2004 Indian Ocean earthquake and tsunami when she was on vacation in Thailand with her husband Enrique (Quique) Álvarez and three sons Lucas, Simón, and Tomás. She was severely injured in the tsunami and nearly died.

She was portrayed in the 2012 film The Impossible by Naomi Watts (with the name changed to Bennett), who was nominated for the Academy Award for Best Actress for her performance. The family's nationality was unspecified in the film.

Depiction in media 
Belón is credited in the cast of the 2012 film The Impossible for providing her story and working on the set in Thailand in the same locations as the original tsunami. Belón chose Naomi Watts to play her in the film, stating that Watts was her favorite actress after seeing the film 21 Grams. She worked with screenwriter Sergio G. Sánchez to ensure her story was accurately told.
  
Belón has appeared on numerous television shows, including Charlie Rose and The View, discussing her experience of making the film and her family's experience of the tsunami. She has been outspoken regarding the fact that her story of survival is not the only one, and that she is only one of many who suffered and survived. She now works as an advocate for those still recovering from the effects of the tsunami. She has said of her experience,

Advocacy 
Belón now travels around the world as an advocate for survivors of the tsunami and gives motivational speeches about how she overcame the turmoil and two years of recovery following her injuries. She was the Spotlight Guest Speaker at the Share Iuvare Business Convention in 2015. Also in 2015 she was a speaker at the World Business Forum. In 2013 she was a guest lecturer at the Instituto de Cervantes in Gibraltar.

Personal life 
She studied to be a physician and also previously worked as a professor of management with the ESADE Business School, and as a business consultant for companies like Pepsi. She has stated that some of her family is from the Canary Islands.

References

External links
 
 María Belón interview (Red Carpet News Extra, posted to YouTube on 2013Jan27)

1966 births
Living people
20th-century Spanish physicians
21st-century Spanish physicians
2004 Indian Ocean earthquake and tsunami
Spanish women physicians
20th-century women physicians
21st-century women physicians
20th-century Spanish women